SBS V-Radio is South Korea's second digital radio station. It is owned by the Seoul Broadcasting System.

Programs
SBS V-Radio was a radio station that ran mostly programs commissioned from SBS Love FM and SBS Power FM along with some original programming. In 2016 it was reformatted to simulcast internet radio station SBS GorealRadio M, a non-stop music station.

Original programs
07:00 - Morning 20
09:00 - Classic 20 (re-broadcast 00:00)
11:00 - Hits 20 (re-broadcast 06:00)
12:00 - Lunch 20
14:00 - Pops 20 (re-broadcast 02:00)
16:00 - Dance 20
18:00 - Dinner 20 (re-broadcast 04:00)
20:00 - Indie 20
22:00 - Relax 20

References

V-Radio